Bucks Mill is an unincorporated community located within Colts Neck Township, in Monmouth County, New Jersey, United States. Bucks Mill Road is the main road that passes north and south through the area; County Route 537 travels to the south of Bucks Mill, near the Hominy Hill Golf Course. Homes, equestrian facility and horse farms, and the township-owned Bucks Mill Recreational Area are located in the area. The settlement is named for Bucks Mill, a gristmill that derived its power from a watermill on the Yellow Brook. Originally built in 1854 and owned for many years by William Buck, Alfred Buck, and Garrett Buck, it was destroyed by a fire on October 30, 1967. The watermill is the only remaining artifact of the original complex and stands today on the side of Bucks Mill Road.

References

Colts Neck Township, New Jersey
Unincorporated communities in Monmouth County, New Jersey
Unincorporated communities in New Jersey